Shane Taylor may refer to:
 Shane Taylor (actor)
 Shane Taylor (wrestler)